Jamerican Man is the debut album by vocalist David Oliver.

Reception

Originally released in 1977 as Jamerican Man, later pressings were changed to the self-titled David Oliver. The album reached number eighteen on the Billboard Top Soul LPs chart. The single, "Ms.", peaked at number thirteen on the Soul Singles chart in 1978. The album also contained the original version of "Friends & Strangers" that Ronnie Laws recorded for his album of the same name in 1977.

Track listing
What Kinda Woman - (Wayne Henderson, David Oliver)  4:59
Love So Strong - (David Oliver, Ruth Robinson)  3:31 	
Ms. - (David Oliver, Ruth Robinson)  5:20 	
Friends & Strangers - (David Oliver, Ruth Robinson, William Jeffreys)  4:59
Let's Make Happiness (David Oliver, Ruth Robinson, Wayne Henderson)  4:37 	
Munchies - (David Oliver, Lawrence Smith)  5:08 	
You And I - (Donny Beck)  5:00 	
Playin' At Bein' A Winner - (David Oliver, Ruth Robinson)  4:35

Charts

Singles

References

External links
 David Oliver-Jamerican Man at Discogs

1977 debut albums
David Oliver (singer) albums
Mercury Records albums
Albums produced by Wayne Henderson (musician)